The 2018 North Carolina A&T Aggies football team represented North Carolina Agricultural and Technical State University as member of the Mid-Eastern Athletic Conference (MEAC) in the 2018 NCAA Division I FCS football season. This season marked the 95th for the program, which was led by first-year head coach Sam Washington. The Aggies finished the season with a record of 9–2 and 6–1 in MEAC play, capturing their tenth conference title. The Aggies also earned an invitation to the Celebration Bowl where they defeated Southwestern Athletic Conference champion Alcorn State, earning their sixth black college football national championship. The Aggies played their home games at the newly renamed BB&T Stadium. They are a member of the Mid-Eastern Athletic Conference (MEAC).

Previous season
The Aggies finished the season 12–0, 8–0 in MEAC play, to finish in first place and capturing their ninth MEAC Championship. The Aggies were invited to compete in the 2017 Celebration Bowl, where they defeated Southwestern Athletic Conference champion Grambling State, earning their fifth black college football national championship.

Before the season
At the conclusion of the 2017 football season, the Aggies lost key players such as three-time MEAC Offensive Lineman of the year and two-time All-American Brandon Parker, two-time first-team All-MEAC center Darriel Mack & Khris Gardin, who finished his career second all-time in NCAA history in punt return yards. The Aggies also lost third-team all-MEAC outside linebacker Marcus Albert, Jeremy Taylor & two-time first-team All-MEAC safety/linebacker Jeremy Taylor, who was the team's leading tackler in 2017. In addition to the players, the program lost head coach Rod Broadway, who is the program's all-time leader in winning percentage. Broadway decided to retire in January after weeks of speculation following the team's undefeated season and national championship.

Recruiting

Prior to National Signing Day in February 2018, three players enrolled for the spring semester in order to participate in spring practice. 
On National Signing Day, A&T signed 15 additional players out of high school that completed the 2018 recruiting class. Of the class, 9 players were from North Carolina, including three players from Greensboro.

Award watch lists

MEAC preseason poll
In a vote of the MEAC head coaches and sports information directors, the Aggies were unanimously picked as the favorites to win the MEAC championship receiving 19 of 20 first place votes (coaches are not allowed to vote for their own team).

Preseason All-MEAC Teams
The Aggies had nine players selected to the preseason all-MEAC teams. Quarterback Lamar Raynard was selected as the preseason offensive player of the year.

Offense

1st team

Lamar Raynard – QB

Marquell Cartwright – RB

Elijah Bell – WR

Leroy Hill – TE

Marcus Pettiford – OL

Defense

1st team

Darryl Johnson, Jr. – DL

Timadre Abram – DB

Mac McCain – DB

2nd team

Julian McKnight – DL

Schedule
North Carolina A&T's game against fellow Mid-Eastern Athletic Conference (MEAC) member Morgan State was considered a non-conference game and did figured in the conference standings.

Roster

Coaching staff

Game summaries

vs. Jacksonville State

at East Carolina

The Aggies upset East Carolina, 28–23, and in the post-game celebration, head coach Sam Washington declared in response to the team being a so-called "buy game" for the Pirates: "Tell them to bring me my money." The statement and ensuing celebration has since become an internet meme.

Gardner–Webb

Morgan State

South Carolina State

at Delaware State

Florida A&M

at Bethune–Cookman

Norfolk State

at Savannah State

at North Carolina Central

Alcorn State – Celebration Bowl

Post season

2019 NFL draft

The 2019 NFL Draft will be held on April 25–27 in Nashville, Tennessee. The following A&T players were either selected or signed as undrafted free agents following the draft.

2019 CFL draft
The 2019 CFL Draft took place on May 2, 2019. The following A&T players were either selected or signed as undrafted free agents following the draft.

Ranking movements

References

North Carolina AandT
North Carolina A&T Aggies football seasons
Black college football national champions
Mid-Eastern Athletic Conference football champion seasons
Celebration Bowl champion seasons
North Carolina A&T Aggies football